Wāw rubba is a usage of the Arabic word wa. Whereas the usual use of wa is as a conjunction (meaning 'and'), the wāw rubba is used, particularly in poetry, in an exclamatory fashion to introduce a new subject. In English, it is sometimes known as the 'and of asseveration'.

Usage
Wāw rubba is used to introduce a noun followed by a verb phrase. The noun in such a construction is always in the genitive case. Useful English translations include 'many a...', 'I remember...', 'I think of...', 'Oh, that...!' The construction is often used to mark a transition within a poem.

Examples 
In his muʿallaqa, Imruʾ al-Qays says:

This riddle on the touchstone likewise begins with wāw rubba, here rendered simply as 'someone':

Origin of name
Wāw rubba takes its name from the letter wāw, with which the word wa ('and') is written, and the word rubba, meaning 'many'; thus the phrase wāw rubba means 'the wāw of many, the wāw equivalent in meaning to rubba'. This name arises from the supposition that the wāw functions like the word rubba, and moreover that this usage originated through phrases like wa-rubba rajulin ('and many a man') from which the word rubba was elided. However, in practice wāw rubba does not necessarily denote a multitude, nor is there evidence for extensive use of the sequence wa-rubba as opposed to rubba appearing on its own. While still conventional, then, the term wāw rubba can be viewed as a misnomer.

References

Arabic words and phrases
Arabic grammar